NGC 1559 is a barred spiral galaxy in the constellation Reticulum.  It is also a Seyfert galaxy. Although it was originally thought to be a member of the Dorado Group, subsequent observations have shown that it is in fact not a member of any galaxy group or cluster and does not have any nearby companions.  NGC 1559 has massive spiral arms and strong star formation.  It contains a small bar which is oriented nearly east-west and spans 40″.  Its bar and disc are the source of very strong radio emissions.

Three supernovae have been discovered in NGC 1559:  SN 1984J, SN 1986L, and SN 2005df (Type Ia, mag 12.3). All three were discovered by Australian amateur astronomer Robert Evans.

References

External links

 

14814
1559
Reticulum (constellation)
Barred spiral galaxies
Seyfert galaxies